Tuekakas, (also Tiwi-teqis, meaning "senior warrior") commonly known as Old Chief Joseph or Joseph the Elder (c. 1785-1871), was a Native American leader of the Wallowa Band of the Nez Perce. Old Joseph was one of the first Nez Percé converts to Christianity and a vigorous advocate of the tribe's early peace with whites. In 1855 he aided Washington's territorial governor and set up a Nez Percé reservation that expanded from Oregon into Idaho. The Nez Perce agreed to give up a section of their tribal lands in return for an assurance whites would not intrude upon the sacred Wallowa Valley.

That confined the Nez Percé to a  reservation in Idaho, which was only one tenth its previous size. Old Joseph argued that this second treaty was never approved by his people. Feeling deceived, Old Joseph condemned the United States, slashed his American flag, shredded his Bible, and declined to move his band from the Wallowa Valley or to sign the treaty that would make the new reservation boundaries legitimate.
 
He was the father of Hinmahtoo-yahlatkekht, also known as "Young Joseph" or Chief Joseph.

See also
 Joseph Gale

References

External links
 http://www.indigenouspeople.net/joseph.htm
 http://www.myhero.com/myhero/hero.asp?hero=c_joseph
 https://www.pbs.org/weta/thewest/people/a_c/chiefjoseph.htm

1780s births
1871 deaths
Converts to Christianity from pagan religions
Native American history of Oregon
Native American leaders
Nez Perce people
18th-century Native Americans
Native American people from Oregon